In 1979, Honeywell Information Systems announced a new programming language for their time-sharing service named TEX, an acronym for the Text Executive text processing system. TEX was a first-generation scripting language developed around the time of AWK and used by Honeywell initially as an in-house system test automation tool.

TEX extended the Honeywell Time-Sharing service (TSS) line editor with programmable capabilities, which allowed the user greater latitude in developing ease-of-use editing extensions as well as writing scripts to automate many other time-sharing tasks formerly done by more complex TSS FORTRAN programs.

Overview
TEX was a subsystem of Honeywell Timesharing (TSS). Users would enter the TSS command tex to change to a TEX session mode of operation. TEX expressions could be entered directly on the command line or run from a script file via the TEX command call .

TEX programs are a collection of TSS line editing commands, TSS session commands, and TEX statements. TEX variables could be inserted into TSS commands, and TSS line editor commands via the TEX variable substitution feature. TEX programs were primarily designed to extend the line editor system. Consequently, TEX had no concept of file input/output relying instead on applying line edit commands to the working file and saving as needed.

The key developers of TEX at Honeywell were Eric Clamons and Richard Keys with Robert Bemer, famous as the father of ASCII and grandfather of COBOL, acting in an advisory capacity.

TEX should not be confused with TeX a typesetting markup language invented by Donald Knuth.

The American Mathematical Society has also claimed a trademark for TeX, which was rejected because at the time this was tried (the early 1980s), "TEX" (all caps) was registered by Honeywell for the "Text EXecutive" text processing system.

TEX Variables
All variables  were stored as strings and converted to integer numeric values when required. Floating point variables, arrays, or other datatypes common in current scripting languages did not exist in a TEX environment.

All variables were stored in a single global variable pool which users had to manage in order to avoid 
variable naming conflicts. There were no variable scoping capabilities in TEX. Variable names were limited to 40 characters.

TEX provided several internal read-only registers called star functions 
which changed state when certain TEX string parsing operations were executed. Star functions provided a means to get the current date and time, resultant strings from a split or scan string parsing operation or from TEX internal call level and TSS session information.

The maximum length of a string value was 240 ASCII characters. This includes intermediate results when evaluating a TEX expression. Numeric string values are limited to 62 digits in the string, including the (-) for negative numbers. Numeric values are also normalized where leading zeros are stripped from the string representation.

Some examples of variable usage:

    _ we can use quotes or other characters as delimiters as long as the string doesn't contain them
    _ and can use the comma operator to concat them together
    _
    a="hello"
    b=/world/
    c=a,/ /,b

    _ the out statement prints "hello world" to the terminal without quotes
    _
    out:c

    _ Using TEX variables in a line editing command to find a line containing "hello"
    _ replacing the "hello" string with the "hello world" string
    _
    rs:a:c

TEX Operators
TEX has three types of operators:
 arithmetic
 boolean
 string
When constructing a TEX expression, all spaces must be compressed out except for string literals. In general, spaces delimit TEX statements.

     _ NOTE: In the "d=" statement, there are no spaces between the commas 
     _ or the variables
     a="hello"   b=" "   c="world"   d=a,b,c   out:d

     _ In contrast, a space  is needed to separate the 'if' from its expression and 
     _ the expression from the next TEX command to conditionally execute
     _
     if a:eqs:"hello" out:a

TEX Arithmetic Operators
supports only basic integer arithmetic operations:
 unary sign number prefix (+/-)
 addition (+),
 subtraction (-),
 multiplication (*) and
 division (/)

with up to 16 levels of parentheses.

Some examples are:

    a=1
    b=-2
    c=3*(a-b)/(2*2+(4+1))

TEX Boolean Operators
come in two flavors for:
 numeric comparisons
 string comparisons
They were most often used within the context of an IF control statement.

A list of available numeric comparison operators are:
 :eq: or :eqn: returns t for true if two values are numerically equal
 :ge: or :gen: returns t for true if first value is numerically equal to or greater than second value
 :le: or :len: returns t for true if first value is numerically equal to or lesser than second value
 :gt: or :gtn: returns t for true if first value is numerically greater than second value
 :lt: or :ltn: returns t for true if first value is numerically lesser than second value
 :ne: or :nen: returns t for true if first value is not numerically equal to the second value

A list of available string comparison operators are:
 :eqs: returns t for true if two strings values are identical in characters, case and length
 :ges: returns t for true if first string is greater than or equal to the second string in characters case and length
 :les: returns t for true if first string is less than or equal to the second string in characters case and length
 :gts: returns t for true if first string is greater than or equal to the second string in characters case and length
 :lts: returns t for true if first string is less than to the second string in characters case and length
 :nes: returns t for true if first string is NOT equal to the second string in characters case and length

String boolean operators are affected by the TEX CASE mode. Under CASE mode, strings such as 'ABC' and 'abc' were considered equal (TEX converted 'ABC' to 'abc' prior to the comparison). Under NOCASE mode, the 'abc' string would be considered greater than the 'ABC' string based on the ASCII code point value for 'a' being a larger value than the 'A' ASCII code point value.

The boolean NOT operator was represented by the circumflex character (^).

Some examples of boolean operators in action:

    if name:eqs:"luke"   out:"May the force be with you!"
 
    if ^age:gtn:500  out:"Heh, you can't be Yoda!" 

TEX did not provide and or or connectors to make more complex boolean expressions. Instead, programmers had to use nested if statements for and connections and a block of if...do something statements to handle or connections:

    _ an example of an and construct
    if a:eqs:'a'   if b:eqs:'b'  goto !its_true
    goto !its_false
 
    _ an example of an or construct
    if a:eqs:'a'   goto !its_true
    if b:eqs:'b'   goto !its_true
    if c:eqs:'c'   goto !its_true
    goto !its_false
 
    !its_true out:"It's true!" goto !next_block
    !its_false out:"It's false!" goto !next_block
 
    !next_block
    ...do something...

TEX String Operators
String concatenation in TEX was provided by the comma operator:

    a="hello"," "," world"

TEX provided several string-splitting operators:
 splitting a string from the left and saving the left side ('])
 splitting a string from the left and saving the right side (]')
 splitting a string from the right and saving the left side ('[)
 splitting a string from the right and saving the right side ([')

Some string-splitting examples:

    a="hello world"
    b=a']5
    c=a]'5
 
    out:"It's a strange new ",c," but ",b," anyways!"

TEX provided several string scanning/parsing operators:
 scanning a string from the left for a given substring and saving the left side ('>)
 scanning a string from the left for a given substring and saving the right side (>')
 scanning a string from the right for a given substring and saving the left side ('<)
 scanning a string from the right for a given substring and saving the right side (<')

Some string scanning/parsing examples:

    a="hello world"
    b=a'>" "

    out:b

TEX Labels
All TEX statement labels were prefixed with a (!). Statement labels were ignored unless referenced by a goto or call statement. One notable feature of TEX was the ability to call or goto labels in other files. Coupled with the TEX SUBS mode meant that TEX could create new scripts via line editing, save, and then call or goto labels in these scripts dynamically.

The mypgm.tex file:

    !hello
    out:"hello world"
    return
 
    !hello2
    out:"hello world again"
    exit
 
    (end-of-file marker)

Calling by label example:

    call /mycat/mypgm.tex!hello

In the above example, TEX would process the /mycat/mypgm.tex file searching for the !hello label(*). TEX would continue processing the file until a return statement or exit statement was executed, or an end-of-file was reached.

Goto by label example:

    goto /mycat/mypgm.tex!hello2

In the next example, TEX would process the /mycat/mypgm.tex file searching for the !hello2 label(*). TEX would continue processing until an exit statement or end of file was reached. An error would be thrown if a return statement was executed and there were no CALLs active.

(*) TEX did not check for duplicate labels in the same file, consequently execution was unpredictable if present.

TEX Substitutions
TEX provides the SUBS and NOSUBS commands to activate or deactivate variable substitution for TEX statements or TSS commands.

    xx=/out:"Hello World"/
 
    subs ?
 
    ?xx?
       
    nosubs
 
    ?xx?

In the above example, the xx variable contains a TEX output statement as its value. The subs command specifies that (?) is the substitution character for all future statements of the program. Upon processing the first ?xx? line, TEX will substitute the out:"Hello World" command for ?xx? and then execute the resultant statement. The nosubs command turns off substitutions for subsequent statements and so TEX issues an error when it tries to execute the second ?xx? line.

TEX Indirections
In addition to variable substitution, TEX supported variable indirection. Variables prefixed with the underscore character (_) were considered to contain a variable name as their contents and so TEX would use indirection to get the value. TEX limited indirection to 64 levels to avoid possible looping.

As an example:

    a="b"
    b="c"
    c="hello world"
 
    _ here the out:__a would print "hello world" to the terminal, 
    _ since two underscore prefix of a means a >> b >> c
    out:__a

TEX Input/Output
Honeywell Timesharing sessions had a concept of the working file. To edit an existing file, you would first make it the working file via the old command. To create a new file, you would first create it via the new command. Once changes were complete, you would either save (for new files) or resave the working file. Basically only one file could be open for editing at a time.

TEX programs were primarily designed to extend the line editor system. Consequently, TEX had no concept of file input/output relying instead on making changes to the working file via line edit commands and saving as needed.

However, TEX did provide terminal-oriented input/output commands:
 in  -- print a prompt and pause until text is entered, storing it in the *in star variable
 out -- print a message

A simple example using in and out:

    in:"What is your name?"
 
    out:"Hi ",*in

TEX Star Functions
as a means to access results/side-effects of TEX subsystem functions or to represent ASCII terminal codes.

A list of star variables follows:
 *account - user account number associated with the current userid
 *cl - the current line of the current file being edited
 *lcl - the length of the *cl value
 *clvl - current depth of calls
 *date - current date in the form of YY-MM-DD
 *eof - T if positioned after the last line of the current file or when there is no current file
 *in - contains the last response to an in or int TEX command execution
 *lin - length of *in
 *left or *l - left string from scan or split command execution
 *lleft or *ll - length of *left
 *middle or *m - middle string from scan or split command execution
 *lmiddle or *lm - length of *middle
 *right  or *r - right string from scan or split command execution
 *lright or *lr - length of *right
 *null - represents the null string
 *random - contains a randomly selected digit from 0 to 9
 *rmdr - remainder of the last division operation
 *snumb - system number of the last batch job run
 *svmd - TEX commands to restore the TEX modes at the time of the last interfile call or goto
 *sw00 to *sw35 - examines the TSS 36-bit switch word with 1 bit returning a T value and a 0 bit returning a F
 *time - current time in hh:mm:ss always to the nearest second
 *userid - current userid

TEX ASCII/Terminal Codes
Terminal codes were mapped into star variables for easy reference in TEX programs. 

 *nul - null
 *soh - start of header
 *stx - start of text
 *etx - end of text
 *eot - end of transmission
 *enq - enquiry
 *ack - acknowledge
 *bel - bell
 *bs  - backspace
 *ht  - horizontal tab
 *lf  - line feed
 *vt  - vertical tab
 *ff  - form feed
 *cr  - carriage return
 *so  - shift out
 *si  - shift in
 *dle - data link escape
 *dc1 - device control 1
 *dc2 - device control 2
 *dc3 - device control 3
 *dc4 - device control 4 (stop)
 *nak - negative acknowledge
 *syn - synchronous idle
 *etb - end of transmission block
 *can - cancel
 *em  - end of medium
 *sub - substitute
 *esc - escape
 *fs  - field separator
 *gs  - group separator
 *rs  - record separator
 *us  - unit separator
 *del - delete

Commands
TEX was built on top of the TSS line editor, as such line editor commands could be used within a TEX program. TEX programs may have:
 TSS line editing commands
 TEX commands
 TEX modes
 TSS subsystem commands

TSS Line Editing Commands
The general command format was:

    verb:<search_expression>;<repeat_count>;<occurrence_count>:<replacement_string>

The  could contain a range as in F:/hello/,/world/ to find all lines that start with the string "hello" and  contain the string "world" too.

TEX provided standard line-based file editing commands:
 P: print current line
 F: move forward through the current file line by line
 B: move backward through the current file line by line
 A: append after the current line
 I: insert before the current line
 R: replace the current with the expression provided
 D: delete the current line
 copy: copy the current line
 cut: copy and delete the current line
 paste: paste what was cut or copied before the current line

Each command could be modified with a numeric repeat value or with an asterisk (*):
 P;999: print next 999 lines from the current position
 P;*: print all lines from the current position to the end of file
 F;999: move forward 999 lines from the current position
 F;*: move to the end of file
 B;999: move backward 999 lines from the current position
 B;*: move to the first line of the file
Commands can be further modified with a line matching string or expression:
 F:/xxx/;999 move forward to the line beginning with 999th occurrence of /xxx/
 B:/xxx/;999 move backward to the line beginning with 999th occurrence of /xxx/
 I:/xxx/;999:/yyy/ insert line yyy before the next 999 lines beginning with /xxx/
 R:/xxx/;999;/yyy/ replace the next 999 lines beginning with /xxx/ with the line /yyy/
 D:/xxx/;999 delete the next 999 lines beginning with /xxx/
For string mode, an S was added. Whenever /xxx/ was found within the line then the edit was applied:
 FS:/xxx/;999 move forward to the 999th occurrence of the string /xxx/
 IS:/xxx/;999:/yyy/ insert the string /yyy/ before the next 999 occurrences of /xxx/
 RS:/xxx/;999:/yyy/ replace the next 999 occurrences of the string /xxx/ with /yyy/
 DS:/xxx/;999 delete the next 999 occurrences of the string /xxx/
Lastly, the commands can be further modified with V to turn on verify mode and with O to specify nth occurrence string mode:
 RVO:/xxx/;99;999:/yyy/ replace the 999th occurrence of string /xxx/ with /yyy/ and repeat it 99 times

There are a few other lesser used editing commands:
 mark – to include files within files when the .mark  statement is found in the current or subsequently included files (recursive operation)
 befl – insert before the current line (normally the "A" command was used to insert after the current line)
 trul  – truncate leftmost columns of the current file
 trur  – truncate rightmost columns of the current file
In all edit command formats, the /xxx/ or /yyy/ or 999 could be replaced with a TEX variable. In addition, the 999 value could be replaced with an asterisk (*) to denote all occurrences.

TEX Commands
TEX did not provide commands for numeric or conditional looping or switch cases as is common in modern scripting languages. These had to be constructed using if, labels and goto commands. As an example, to eliminate duplicate lines from a file, one would use:

    !ELIM_DUPS a=*cl f;1
    _
    !NEXT_LINE if *eof out:"task complete" return
 
    b=*cl if a:eqs:b d goto !NEXT_LINE
 
    a=b f;1 goto !NEXT_LINE

TEX commands:
 call ! – call a subroutine in the current program or in another file. the call ends when a stop or return
 clear  – remove a named variable from the pool or use * to remove all variables
 goto ! – goto the named file and label
 ercall ! – call subroutine on error in the preceding command
 ergoto ! – goto procedure on error in the preceding command
  if  – if conditional, the expression is of the form <variable|value>:op:<variable|value>  where the op is one of the comparator ops mentioned earlier.
 in: – print the expression and wait for input. Store input in the *in variable
 int: – print the expression and wait for input specifically from the terminal. Store the input in the *in variable.
 *null – no-input carriage return from the terminal, used to terminate insert mode in a TEX program. No other commands may be on the same line.
 stop – stop the TEX program
 _ – remarks line
 return – return from a subroutine call
 out: – print the expression to the terminal
 outt: – force print the expression (and all prior output not yet flushed) to the terminal
 split:: – split  at position  starting from the beginning of  placing the results in *left, *middle, and *right star variables
 splitr:: – split  at position  starting from the end of  placing the results in *left, *middle, and *right star variables
 subs  – activate subs mode where TEX will scan for pairs of <subs_characters>, evaluating the expression and placing it in the line prior to executing the line. SUBS mode is turned off by NOSUBS
 trace - activate trace mode where lines are displayed prior to being executed. Trace mode is turned off by NOTRACE
 vari - display all variables and their values including the star variables

TEX Modes
TEX modes defined how other TEX commands would operate. The *svmd variable contained the current state of all TEX modes in the form of TEX commands to restore the modes. Each mode had an inverse command to turn the mode off which could be done at any time.
 trace / notrace – activate trace mode where lines are displayed prior to being executed.
 case / nocase - convert all strings to lowercase prior to comparison operations
 octl  / nooctl - define the octal prefixing character (e.g. octl % and then rs:/BELL/:/%007/)
 mask  / nomask - define the mask character for matching against any character within a search string
 cols  / nocols - define the columns window that string searching are limited to searching

TSS Commands
While beyond the scope of this article, the most commonly used TSS commands were:
 NEW – new file (i.e. empty file; clears editor workspace)
 OLD – old file brought into editor workspace
 SAVE – save a new file (filename can't exist)
 RESAVE – resave editor workspace into an existing file

TEX Examples
This code was excerpted from a TEX based Adventure game written by a team of Explorer Scouts from GE Post 635, Schenectady New York circa 1980. The Adventure game was the first of several popular online text-based adventure games available on the GE Timesharing service. The scouts decided to create their own adventure game using TEX. The original Adventure game used two word commands to navigate Colossal Cave. The parser shown below handled simple two word commands like go west or move right and converted them into x,y deltas for positioning and directional orientation in the game.

Parsing the Adventure two word commands:
  
    ...

    _ force a clear screen on the televideo terminal
    !init 
    out:*esc,":"
    
    _ clear program variables
    rmdr=*null
    del=0
    dir="n"
    xlocn=1    ylocn=1
    return

    _ ___
    _
    _ The PARSER subroutine interprets your input commands and tries to 
    _ pre-process them prior to returning to your program.
    _
    !parser
    qry=*cr,*lf,"-->" sntc=*null call !ask1
    ergo !unkn_cmd verb=ans vdel=0 goto !$ans$_cmd
    _
    !walk_cmd   del=2     call !move_to  return
    !run_cmd    del=4     call !move_to  return
    !fly_cmd    del=6     call !move_to  return
    !swim_cmd   del=2     call !move_to  return
    ...
    !unkn_cmd   return

    !move_to call !ask3 if ans:eqs:*null goto !to_$dir$
    ercall !to_same call !to_$ans$
    _
    !to_locn xlocn=xlocn+xdel ylocn=ylocn+ydel return
    _
    !to_f
    !to_forward
    !to_ahead
    !to_same goto !to_$dir$
    _
    !to_b
    !to_backward goto !inv_$dir$
    _
    !to_r
    !to_right goto !rt_$dir$
    _
    !to_l
    !to_left goto !lt_$dir$
    _
    !inv_south
    !rt_northwest
    !lt_northeast
    !to_n
    !to_north dir="north" xdel=0 ydel=del return
    _
    !inv_west
    !rt_northeast
    !lt_southeast
    !to_e
    !to_east dir="east" xdel=del ydel=0 return
    _
    !inv_north
    !rt_southeast
    !lt_southwest
    !to_s
    !to_south dir="south" xdel=0 ydel=-del return
    _
    !inv_east
    !rt_southwest
    !lt_northwest
    !to_w
    !to_west dir="west" xdel=-del ydel=0 return

    _ adjust delta speed if these words are spotted as in "go very fast"
    !to_very vdel=vdel+1 goto !to_same
    !to_fast del=del+vdel vdel=0 goto !to_same
    !to_slow del=del-vdel vdel=0 goto !to_same

    _ __
    _
    _ The ASK subroutines get your terminal input and break it up depending
    _ on the spaces. ask1 falls into ask2 and ask2 falls into ask3 then returns
    _
    _ rmdr holds remainder of input line, sntc holds remainder of current command sentence
    _ sentences are terminated with a period. ans holds the current word being processed
    _
    !ask1 if rmdr:eqs:*null in:qry rmdr=*in sntc=*null
    !ask2 if sntc:eqs:*null scan:rmdr:"." sntc=*l rmdr=*r]'1
    !ask3 scan:sntc:" " ans=*l sntc=*r return

Rolling dice:

    _ ___
    _
    _ The DICE subroutine rolls the dice for you and returns the answer
    _ in the variable called DICE.
    _
    _ Input to the DICE subroutine is via the DICE variable as shown below :
    _
    _     1d6 - roll the 6-sided die once
    _     3d8 - roll the 8-sided die 3 times
    _     d%  - roll the 100-sided die once (percentage roll)
    _
    !dice if dice:eqs:"d%" dice="1d100"
    scan:dice:"d" i=*l j=*r dice=0
    
    !dice_1 
    k=*random if j:gt:9 k=k,*random
    k=k/j dice=dice+*rmdr+1
    i=i-1 if i:gt:0 goto !dice_1
    
    clear i clear j clear k 
    return

Televideo screen codes:

    _ ___
    _
    _ The following routines allow you to easily draw pictures on the
    _ the Televideo 950 terminal.
    _
    _      xyplot: positions the cursor
    _ 
    _      gr:     turns graphics mode on
    _
    _      nogr:   turns graphics mode off
    _
    _      clear:  clears the screen
    _
    _      load:   used by xyplot to load the xytbl
    _
    !xyplot
    ercall !load xytbl=xytbl
    cx=(xytbl]'(x-1))']1
    cy=(xytbl]'(y-1))']1
    out:*ESC,"=",cy,cx,z
    return
    _
    _
    !load
    xytbl=" !",/"/,"#$%&'()*+,-./"
    xytbl=xytbl,"0123456789:;<=>?",*AT,"ABCDEFGHIJKLMNOPQRSTUVWXYZ[\]^_"
    xytbl=xytbl,"`abcdefghijklmnopqrstuvwxyz{|}~",*DEL
    return
    _
    _
    !gr nosubs
    out:*ESC,"$" subs $
    $*SVMD$ return
    _
    _
    !nogr out:*ESC,"%" return
    _
    _
    !clear out:*ESC,":" return

Notable TEX Features
The most notable feature in TEX was its SUBS mode allowing variable values to crossover and become executable code. It allowed a programmer to create new variables on the fly to be used in later TEX expressions in a LISP-like fashion. TEX also allowed programmers to create scripts on the fly via line editing, saving the content to file later to be executed as part of the current program using interfile call and goto statements. However, in most cases, these features were used to provide simple dynamic goto statements in code as seen in the Adventure game parser example. What other kinds of Artificial Intelligence constructs could be developed were never fully explored.

An example of creating variables on the fly and then using them to do an interfile goto.

    _ incorporate x,y,z into the global variable pool
    cmd="x=1 y=2 z=3"
    subs ?
    ?cmd?

    _ next we modify mycat/mypgm_1_2.tex to say "hello world" we are writing some code to 
    _execute later in our script
    _
    old mycat/mypgm_1_2.tex
    r:*cl:/!label_3 out:'Hello World'/
    resave mycat/mypgm_1_2.tex

    _ lastly we subs in x,y,z and then evaluate the goto mypgm_1_2!label_3 which does an interfile goto
    _
    goto mycat/mypgm_?x?_?y?.tex!label_?z?

The TEX program above illustrates dynamic script creation and then execution via substitution, file editing and interfile goto. In effect, programs writing programs were possible although never done. In the above example, the mycat/mypgm_1_2.tex file would be executed at label_3 printing out "hello world".

References

 TEX User Guide (DF72) - Honeywell Information Systems, Copyright 1979
 TEX Quick Reference - Honeywell Information Systems, Copyright 1979
 Software Catalog (AW15 Rev05), Honeywell Information Systems, Copyright 1979, Section 4 - Series 600/6000, Series 60/Level 66, pg 4-42 TEX Executive Processor
 R.W.Bemer, "Introduction to the TEX language - Part I", Interface Age Magazine, volume 3, No. 8, 144–147, 1978 August
 R.W.Bemer, "Introduction to the TEX language - Part II", Interface Age Magazine, volume3, No. 9, 124–127, 1978 September
 R.W.Bemer, "Introduction to the TEX language - Part III", Interface Age Magazine, volume 3, No. 10, 126–131, 1978 October
 R.W.Bemer, "TEX-based screen editor", Proc. HLSUA Forum XXXI, 158–160, 1980 Oct 12-15 World's first half-duplex full screen editor.

Procedural programming languages
Programming languages created in 1979